William Brown (April 19, 1779 – October 6, 1833) was a U.S. Representative from Kentucky.

Born in Frederick County, Virginia, Brown attended the common schools. He moved with his father to Bourbon County, Kentucky, in 1784 and to Cynthiana, Kentucky, about 1795. Brown studied law and was admitted to the bar. He served as a colonel in the War of 1812.

He moved to Jacksonville, Illinois, in 1832, where he died October 6, 1833.

References

External links 
 

1779 births
1833 deaths
United States Army colonels
Democratic-Republican Party members of the United States House of Representatives from Kentucky